Oxford Computer Consultants (OCC) was founded in 1989 John Boyle and Kaz Librowski. It employs over 100 IT professionals and is a Microsoft Gold Certified Partner.

Specializing in bespoke software development for a variety of professional and industrial sectors, OCC also provides IT consultancy services to a wide range of industries. It has produced OCC Marketplace, a product for local authorities for the Government's individual budgets program. It is part of a suite of applications for local government.

OCC's local government products are used by over 80 councils. They specialise in integrated social care finance solutions with products such as 'ContrOCC' is used by adults’ and children's social care finance teams to manage contracts, make payments to providers and collect contributions from users. Another of OCC's flagship products is 'MarketPlace', a powerful and intuitive search engine for social care services and information, integrated with NHS Choices, Ofsted, CQC and council case management and finance systems.

Oxford Computer Consultants has contributed towards research into a wearable home-monitoring system for people with neurodegenerative diseases such as Parkinson's disease. It was also an inventor of INDIGO software in the assistive technology field, virtual reality glasses for people with Parkinson's disease.

References

Information technology consulting firms of the United Kingdom
Computer companies of the United Kingdom
Software companies of the United Kingdom
Management consulting firms of the United Kingdom
Companies based in Oxford
Computer companies established in 1989
Software companies established in 1989